Exc may refer to:

 EXC code, a condensed matter physics software package
 Excalibur Airways, a defunct English airline
 Excosecant
 Exelon, an American energy company
 Exeter Central railway station, in England
 Exhibition Centre station (MTR), in Hong Kong

See also
Esc (disambiguation)